František Vlk (30 May 1925 – 4 August 2003) was a Czech footballer who played as a forward. He played his club football in Czechoslovakia for Slavia Prague, ATK Praha, Ingstav Teplice and Jiskra Liberec. He celebrated the 1946–47 Czechoslovak First League title with Slavia. He died on 4 August 2003, at the age of 78.

References

External links

1925 births
2003 deaths
Czech footballers
Czechoslovak footballers
Czechoslovakia international footballers
SK Slavia Prague players
Dukla Prague footballers
FK Teplice players
Association football forwards